Hongfu Temple is a Buddhist temple located in Fengxian District of Shanghai, China.

History
Hongfu Temple was first established in 1766, during the mid-Qing dynasty, the modern temple was founded in 1995.

Architecture
Along the central axis are the Paifang, Four Heavenly Kings Hall, Mahavira Hall and Buddhist Texts Library. There are over 10 halls and rooms on both sides, including Guru Hall, Abbot Hall, Monastic Dining Hall, Monastic Reception Hall and Meditation Hall.

Paifang
The Paifang is engraved with the words "Hongfu Temple" written by the former Venerable Master of the Buddhist Association of China Zhao Puchu.

Four Heavenly Kings Hall
The statues of Maitreya Buddha, Skanda and Four Heavenly Kings are enshrined in the Hall of Four Heavenly Kings. They are the eastern Dhṛtarāṣṭra, the southern Virūḍhaka, the western Virūpākṣa, and the northern Vaiśravaṇa.

Mahavira Hall
The Mahavira Hall enshrining the wood carving statues of Sakyamuni, Suryaprabha and Bhaisajyaguru. Guanyin, Manjushri and Samantabhadra are placed at Sakyamuni's back. The statues of Sixteen Arhats and Sixteen Yakshas stand on both sides of the hall.

References

External links
 

Buddhist temples in Shanghai
Buildings and structures in Shanghai
Tourist attractions in Shanghai
1995 establishments in China
20th-century Buddhist temples
Religious buildings and structures completed in 1995